Stephen Winn (born 16 September 1959) is an English former professional footballer who played in the Football League as a forward for Rotherham United, Torquay United and Hartlepool United. He was on the books of Scunthorpe United without playing for their first team, appeared in non-league football for South Bank and Guisborough Town, and played football in Australia for Marconi, Heidelberg United and Inter Monaro.

References

1959 births
Living people
People from Thornaby-on-Tees
Footballers from County Durham
English footballers
Association football forwards
Rotherham United F.C. players
Torquay United F.C. players
Scunthorpe United F.C. players
Hartlepool United F.C. players
South Bank F.C. players
Guisborough Town F.C. players
Marconi Stallions FC players
Heidelberg United FC players
English Football League players
English expatriate footballers
Expatriate soccer players in Australia